The Ministry of Agriculture and Irrigation (MOLI) is a ministry in the Burmese government responsible for agriculture and irrigation. Until 8 August 1996, it was named the Ministry of Agriculture. In 2016, President Htin Kyaw composed it with the Ministry of Livestock, Fisheries and Rural Development as Ministry of Agriculture, Livestock and Irrigation.

Departments 
 Minister's Office
 Department of Agriculture
 Irrigation and Water Utilization Management Department
 Agricultural Mechanisation Department
 Department of Agriculture Land Management and Statistics
 Department of Planning
 Myanma Agricultural Development Bank
 Department of Agriculture Research
 Yezin Agricultural University
 Department of Industrial Crops Development
 Department of Cooperative
 Department of Fisheries

References

Agriculture
Myanmar
Myanmar
Agricultural organisations based in Myanmar